Matthias Jansz van Geuns (Groningen, 15 September 1758 - Haarlem, 21 November 1839) was a Dutch Mennonite teacher and minister.

Matthias Jansz van Geuns was the son of Jan Stevens van Geuns, and served in Makkum 1783-1787, Harlingen 1787-1792 and in Haarlem 1792-1828. He married Tryntje Cornelisd Sytses of Leeuwarden and two of their sons, Cornelis Sytse and Bartel, also became Mennonite ministers. In Haarlem he was minister of the congregation in the Peuzelaarsteeg, along with several friends who put together a songbook with 150 songs, 74 of which were written by Aagje Deken. He is also noted as a silhouettist, and made silhouettes of many of his family and friends.

References

1758 births
1839 deaths
18th-century Dutch artists
19th-century Anabaptist ministers
19th-century Dutch artists
Dutch artists
Dutch Mennonites
Members of Teylers Eerste Genootschap
Mennonite ministers
Mennonite writers
People from Groningen (city)
Silhouettists
Mennonite artists